G.Madugula or Gangaraju Madugula is a village and a Mandal in Alluri Sitharama Raju district in the state of Andhra Pradesh in India.

Geography
It has an average elevation of 1097 metres (3602 ft).

References 

Villages in Alluri Sitharama Raju district
Mandals in Alluri Sitharama Raju district